The Tarver Plantation, also known as Tarva Plantation, located on Tarva Rd. (Co. Rt. 122) north of Newton in Baker County, Georgia includes a plantation house built in about 1850.  It was listed on the National Register of Historic Places in 1989.

It was owned and used by Henry Tarver from about 1850 to 1897.  In 1850 Henry Tarver owned 87 slaves.

It includes Greek Revival architecture.  In 1989 the property included one contributing building and five non-contributing ones.

References

Houses on the National Register of Historic Places in Georgia (U.S. state)
Greek Revival architecture in Georgia (U.S. state)
Houses completed in 1850
National Register of Historic Places in Baker County, Georgia
Plantations in Georgia (U.S. state)